Rugeley Trent Valley is a railway station located on the outskirts of Rugeley in Staffordshire, England. It is one of two stations serving Rugeley, the other being Rugeley Town. It is on the eastern side of the town close to the Rugeley Trent Valley Trading Estate and located close to the River Trent. West Midlands Trains operate the station, and all trains serving it.

It is a minor station on the Trent Valley section of the West Coast Main Line. It is also the junction with the Chase Line from Birmingham and Walsall.

History
The main line had opened back in September 1847 and the station along with it. Services had previously been withdrawn in January 1965, as a result of the Beeching cuts.

From the mid-1960s until 1998, it was served only by local stopping trains between Stafford and either Rugby or (from 1987)  – these were withdrawn in 2004 when work began to upgrade the main line to four tracks, with bus replacements operating until London Midland introduced the present semi-fast service between London Euston and Crewe via Stafford in 2008.

The station was the location of Queen Elizabeth II's naming of Class 67 locomotive No. 67029 Royal Diamond, marking her diamond wedding anniversary with Prince Philip, on 12 October 2007.

Layout
Rugeley Trent Valley has three platforms with Platform 3 located at the main entrance and Platforms 1 and 2 located on an island platform. Between Platforms 2 and 3 there are two fast lines for non-stop services. All platforms are electrified.

Rugeley Trent Valley is unstaffed but does have a ticket machine and a PERTIS machine at the entrance, as the Penalty fare scheme operates here. Intending passengers must buy a ticket or permit to travel before boarding.

Services
Rugeley Trent Valley is managed by West Midlands Trains who operate all the train services.

Chase Line
The station is served by trains operated by West Midlands Railway and London Northwestern Railway on the Chase Line from Birmingham New Street. From 2008 to 2019 these ran half-hourly during peak times and hourly during off peak times on weekdays, half-hourly on Saturdays and hourly on Sundays. These services used to be extended to terminate at Stafford, but as of the December 2008 timetable changes these services were all been cut back to terminate at Rugeley Trent Valley.

The Chase Line saw a major timetable reorganisation in May 2019, coinciding the completion of electrification.  Services run half-hourly throughout the day, and initially alternate trains terminate at Birmingham International and London Euston via Birmingham, Coventry, Northampton and Milton Keynes.

The service was simplified by 2021, with all trains to and from Rugeley Trent Valley being West Midlands Railway trains terminating at Birmingham New Street, calling at all stations north of and including Walsall, but only stopping at Tame Bridge Parkway south of there.  The frequency remain at 2tph on Mondays to Saturdays, while on Sundays services run hourly.

West Coast Main Line
London Northwestern Railway operate an hourly stopping service, southbound to London Euston and northbound to  via .

Intercity Avanti West Coast services between London Euston and North West England do not call at Rugeley Trent Valley, due to the low passenger numbers compared to other Trent Valley stations. The platforms are also not long enough to accommodate Class 390 Pendolino or Class 221 Tilting Super Voyager Trains which Avanti West Coast operate.

References

Further reading

External links 

Lichfield District
Railway stations in Staffordshire
DfT Category F1 stations
Former London and North Western Railway stations
Railway stations in Great Britain opened in 1847
Railway stations served by West Midlands Trains
Rugeley
1847 establishments in England
Stations on the West Coast Main Line